Langwieder Bach is a river of Bavaria, Germany. It flows into the Gröbenbach south of Dachau.

See also
List of rivers of Bavaria

Rivers of Bavaria
Rivers of Germany